Ewelina Wojnarowska  (born 15 December 1986 in Poznań) is a Polish sprint canoer who has competed since the late 2000s. She won three medals at the ICF Canoe Sprint World Championships with two silvers (K-2 200 m: 2010, K-2 1000 m: 2007) and a bronze (K-4 500 m: 2007). In June 2015, she competed in the inaugural European Games, for Poland in canoe sprint, more specifically, Women's K-1 500m and the Women's K-4 500m with Karolina Naja, Edyta Dzieniszewska, and Beata Mikołajczyk. She earned bronze medals in both events.

References

External links

Living people
Polish female canoeists
1986 births
Sportspeople from Poznań
ICF Canoe Sprint World Championships medalists in kayak
European Games medalists in canoeing
Canoeists at the 2015 European Games
European Games bronze medalists for Poland
Canoeists at the 2016 Summer Olympics
Olympic canoeists of Poland